Castalia is a genus of bivalves belonging to the family Hyriidae.

The species of this genus are found in America.

Species:

Castalia ambigua 
Castalia cordata 
Castalia cretacea 
Castalia crosseana 
Castalia ecarinata 
Castalia inflata 
Castalia martensi 
Castalia minuta 
Castalia multisulcata 
Castalia nehringi 
Castalia orbignyi 
Castalia orinocensis 
Castalia pazi 
Castalia psammoica 
Castalia stevensi 
Castalia undosa

References

Hyriidae
Bivalve genera